M.L.Mary Naidu was an Indian politician. She was a Member of Parliament, representing Andhra Pradesh in the Rajya Sabha the upper house of India's Parliament as a member of the Indian National Congress.

References

1910 births
Year of death missing
Rajya Sabha members from Andhra Pradesh
Indian National Congress politicians from Andhra Pradesh
Women in Andhra Pradesh politics
Women members of the Rajya Sabha